African Markets Overview was a magazine that reported on the monthly performance of stock markets in the greater African region. It discontinued in August 2008.

References

External links
 

2000 establishments in South Africa
2008 disestablishments in South Africa
Business magazines
Defunct magazines published in South Africa
English-language magazines published in South Africa
Magazines established in 2000
Magazines disestablished in 2008
Monthly magazines published in South Africa